One Day International (ODI) cricket is played between international cricket teams who are Full Members of the International Cricket Council (ICC) as well as the top four Associate members. Unlike Test matches, ODIs consist of one inning per team, having a limit in the number of overs, currently 50 overs per innings – although in the past this has been 55 or 60 overs. ODI cricket is List-A cricket, so statistics and records set in ODI matches also count toward List-A records. The earliest match recognized as an ODI was played between England and Australia in January 1971; since when there have been over 4,000 ODIs played by 28 teams. 
This is a list of Bangladeshi Cricket team's One Day International records. It is based on the List of One Day International cricket records, but concentrates solely on records dealing with the Bangladeshi cricket team. Bangladesh played its first-ever ODI in 1986.

Key
The top five records are listed for each category, except for the team wins, losses, draws and ties, all round records and the partnership records. Tied records for fifth place are also included. Explanations of the general symbols and cricketing terms used in the list are given below. Specific details are provided in each category where appropriate. All records include matches played for Bangladesh only, and are correct .

Team records

Overall Record

Team wins, losses, draws and ties 
, Bangladesh has played 406 ODI matches resulting in 147 victories, 252 defeats and 7 no results for an overall winning percentage of 36.20.

First bilateral ODI series wins

First ODI match wins

Winning every match in a series 
In a bilateral series winning all matches is referred to as whitewash. First such event occurred when West Indies toured England in 1976. Bangladesh have recorded 14 such series victories.

Losing every match in a series 
Bangladesh have also suffered such whitewash 28 times.

Team scoring records

Most runs in an innings
The highest innings total scored in ODIs came in the match played between England and the Netherlands in June, 2022. Playing in the first  ODI at VRA Cricket Ground in Amstelveen, the visiting team posted a total of 498/4. The game against Ireland in March, 2023 saw Bangladesh set their highest innings total of 338/8. Bangladesh broke that record as well by scoring 349/6 in the very next ODI match against Ireland on 20 March 2023 at the Sylhet International Cricket Stadium.

Fewest runs in an innings
The lowest innings total scored in ODIs has been scored twice. Zimbabwe were dismissed for 35 by Sri Lanka during the third ODI in Sri Lanka's tour of Zimbabwe in April 2004 and USA were dismissed for same score by Nepal in the sixth ODI of the 2020 ICC Cricket World League 2 in Nepal in February 2020. The lowest score in ODI history for Bangladesh is 58 scored twice, once against West Indies in the 2011 Cricket World Cup and against India in June 2014.

Most runs conceded an innings
The fourth match of the 2005 Natwest Series against the England saw Bangladesh concede their highest innings total of 391/4.

Fewest runs conceded in an innings
The lowest score conceded by Bangladesh for a full inning is 44 scored by Zimbabwe in the fourth ODI of the 2009 series.

Most runs aggregate in a match
The highest match aggregate scored in ODIs came in the match between South Africa and Australia in the fifth ODI of March 2006 series at Wanderers Stadium, Johannesburg when South Africa scored 438/9 in response to Australia's 434/4. The 2019 Cricket World Cup game against Australia in Trent Bridge, Nottingham saw a total of 714 runs being scored.

Fewest runs aggregate in a match
The lowest match aggregate in ODIs is 71 when USA were dismissed for 35 by Nepal in the sixth ODI of the 2020 ICC Cricket World League 2 in Nepal in February 2020. The lowest match aggregate in ODI history for Bangladesh is 127 scored ninth match of the 1980–81 Australia Tri-Nation Series against Australia, which is joint 11th lowest of all time.

Result records
An ODI match is won when one side has scored more runs than the total runs scored by the opposing side during their innings. If both sides have completed both their allocated innings and the side that fielded last has the higher aggregate of runs, it is known as a win by runs. This indicates the number of runs that they had scored more than the opposing side. If the side batting last wins the match, it is known as a win by wickets, indicating the number of wickets that were still to fall.

Greatest win margins (by runs)
The greatest winning margin by runs in ODIs was New Zealand's victory over Ireland by 290 runs in the only ODI of the 2008 England tour. The largest victory recorded by Bangladesh was during the Zimbabwe's tour in 2020 by 169 runs.

Greatest win margins (by balls remaining)
The greatest winning margin by balls remaining in ODIs was England's victory over Canada by 8 wickets with 277 balls remaining in the 1979 Cricket World Cup. The largest victory recorded by Bangladesh is during the Zimbabwe's tour in 2009 when they won by 6 wickets with 229 balls remaining.

Greatest win margins (by wickets)
A total of 55 matches have ended with chasing team winning by 10 wickets with West Indies winning by such margins a record 10 times. Bangladesh have not won any ODI match by this margin.

Highest successful run chases
South Africa holds the record for the highest successful run chase which they achieved when they scored 438/9 in response to Australia's 434/9. Bangladesh's highest innings total while chasing is 322/3 in a successful run chase against West Indies at Taunton, England during the 2019 Cricket World Cup.

Narrowest win margins (by runs)
The narrowest run margin victory is by 1 run which has been achieved in 31 ODI's with Australia winning such games a record 6 times. Bangladesh's has not achieved any victory by 1 run.

Narrowest win margins (by balls remaining)
The narrowest winning margin by balls remaining in ODIs is by winning of the last ball which has been achieved 36 times with both South Africa winning seven times. Bangladesh has not yet achieved a victory by this margin.

Narrowest win margins (by wickets)
The narrowest margin of victory by wickets is 1 wicket which has settled 55 such ODIs. Both West Indies and New Zealand have recorded such victory on eight occasions. Bangladesh has won the match by a margin of one wicket on two occasions.

Greatest loss margins (by runs)
Bangladesh's biggest defeat by runs was against Pakistan in the 2000 Asia Cup against Pakistan at Bangabandhu National Stadium, Bangladesh.

Greatest loss margins (by balls remaining)
The greatest winning margin by balls remaining in ODIs was England's victory over Canada by 8 wickets with 277 balls remaining in the 1979 Cricket World Cup. The largest defeat suffered by Bangladesh was against New Zealand in New Zealand when they lost by 10 wickets with 264 balls remaining.

Greatest loss margins (by wickets)
Bangladesh have lost an ODI match by a margin of 10 wickets on 12 occasions with the most recent being during the sixth match of the Tri-Series in Bangladesh in January 2018.

Narrowest loss margins (by runs)
The narrowest loss of Bangladesh in terms of runs is by 2 runs suffered against Pakistan in the final of the 2012 Asia Cup.

Narrowest loss margins (by balls remaining)
The narrowest winning margin by balls remaining in ODIs is by winning of the last ball which has been achieved 36 times with both South Africa winning seven times. Bangladesh has suffered loss by this margin two times, one being the 2018 Asia Cup Final.

Narrowest loss margins (by wickets)
Bangladesh has suffered defeat by 1 wicket only once.

Individual records

Batting Records

Most career runs
A run is the basic means of scoring in cricket.
India's Sachin Tendulkar has scored the most runs in ODIs with 18,426. Second is Kumar Sangakkara of Sri Lanka with 14,234 ahead of Ricky Ponting from Australia in third with 13,704. Tamim Iqbal is the leading Bangladeshi on this list.

Fastest runs getter

Most runs in each batting position

Most runs against each team

Highest individual score
The fourth ODI of the Sri Lanka's tour of India in 2014 saw Rohit Sharma score the highest Individual score. Liton Das holds the Bangladeshi record when he scored 176 against Zimbabwe in the third ODI of the 2020 series.

Highest individual score – progression of record

Highest score against each opponent

Highest career average
A batsman's batting average is the total number of runs they have scored divided by the number of times they have been dismissed.

Highest Average in each batting position

Most half-centuries
A half-century is a score of between 50 and 99 runs. Statistically, once a batsman's score reaches 100, it is no longer considered a half-century but a century.

Sachin Tendulkar of India has scored the most half-centuries in ODIs with 96. He is followed by the Sri Lanka's Kumar Sangakkara on 93, South Africa's Jacques Kallis on 86 and India's Rahul Dravid and Pakistan's Inzamam-ul-Haq on 83.Tamim Iqbal is the leading Bangladeshi in this list with 55 half-centuries.

Most centuries
A century is a score of 100 or more runs in a single inning.

Tendulkar has also scored the most centuries in ODIs with 49. Bangladesh's Tamim Iqbal has the most centuries for Bangladesh.

Most Sixes

Most Fours

Highest strike rates
Andre Russell of West Indies holds the record for highest strike rate, with minimum 500 balls faced qualification, with 130.22.Soumya Sarkar is the Bangladeshi with the highest strike rate.

Highest strike rates in an inning
James Franklin of New Zealand's strike rate of 387.50 during his 31* off 8 balls against Canada during 2011 Cricket World Cup is the world record for highest strike rate in an innings. Mashrafe Mortaza and Shakib Al Hasan are the highest rated Bangladeshi's on this list.

Most runs in a calendar year
Tendulkar holds the record for most runs scored in a calendar year with 1894 runs scored in 1998.Shahriar Nafees scored 1033 runs in 2006, the most for a Bangladesh batsman in a year.

Most runs in a series
The 1980-81 Benson & Hedges World Series Cup in Australia saw Greg Chappell set the record for the most runs scored in a single series scoring 685 runs. He is followed by Sachin Tendulkar with 673 runs scored in the 2003 Cricket World Cup. Shakib Al Hasan has scored the most runs in a series for a Bangladesh batsman, when he scored 606 runs in the 2019 Cricket World Cup.

Most ducks
A duck refers to a batsman being dismissed without scoring a run. 
Sanath Jayasuriya has scored the equal highest number of ducks in ODIs with 34 such knocks. Tamim Iqbal and Habibul Bashar hold this dubious record for Bangladesh.

Bowling records

Most career wickets 
A bowler takes the wicket of a batsman when the form of dismissal is bowled, caught, leg before wicket, stumped or hit wicket. If the batsman is dismissed by run out, obstructing the field, handling the ball, hitting the ball twice or timed out the bowler does not receive credit.

Shakib Al Hasan is the leading Bangladesh bowler on the list of leading ODI wicket-takers when he overtook Mashrafe Mortaza in the first ODI of the tour of Zimbabwe in July 2021.

Fastest wicket taker

Most career wickets against each team

Best figures in an innings 
Bowling figures refers to the number of the wickets a bowler has taken and the number of runs conceded.
Sri Lanka's Chaminda Vaas holds the world record for best figures in an innings when he took 8/19 against Zimbabwe in December 2001 at Colombo (SSC). Mortaza and Rubel Hossain hold the Bangladeshi record for best bowling figures.

Best figures in an innings – progression of record

Best Bowling Figure against each opponent 
{| class="wikitable sortable" 
|- 
! scope=col | Opposition
! scope=col | Figures
! scope=col | Player
! scope=col | Venue
! scope=col | Date
! scope=col | Ref
|-
|  || scope=row style=text-align:center; | 5/29 ||  || Rose Bowl, Southampton, England||  || 
|-
|  || scope=row style=text-align:center; | 3/36 || rowspan=3| || Zohur Ahmed Chowdhury Stadium, Chittagong, Bangladesh||   || 
|-
|  || scope=row style=text-align:center; | 3/20 || Queens Sports Club, Port of Spain, Trinidad & Tobago||  || 
|-
|  || scope=row style=text-align:center; | 3/51 || Antigua Recreation Ground, St. John's, Antigua and Barbuda||  || 
|-
|  || scope=row style=text-align:center; | 4/29 ||  || Sher-e-Bangla Mirpur Stadium, Mirpur, Bangladesh||  || 
|-
|  || scope=row style=text-align:center; | 3/17 ||  || Sinhalese Sports Club Ground, Colombo, Sri Lanka||  || 
|-
|  || scope=row style=text-align:center; | 6/43 ||  || rowspan=2|Sher-e-Bangla Mirpur Stadium, Mirpur, Bangladesh||  || 
|-
|  || scope=row style=text-align:center; | 5/42 ||  ||  || 
|-
|  || scope=row style=text-align:center; | 6/25 ||  || Gymkhana Club Ground, Nairobi, Kenya||  || 
|-
|  || scope=row style=text-align:center; | 3/29 ||  || Zohur Ahmed Chowdhury Stadium, Chittagong, Bangladesh||  || 
|-
|  || scope=row style=text-align:center; | 6/26 ||  || Sher-e-Bangla Mirpur Stadium, Mirpur, Bangladesh||  || 
|-
|  || scope=row style=text-align:center; | 5/75 ||  || Lord's, London, England||  || 
|-
|  || scope=row style=text-align:center; | 4/23 ||  || Sher-e-Bangla Mirpur Stadium, Mirpur, Bangladesh||  || 
|-
|  || scope=row style=text-align:center; | 5/35 || Taskin Ahmed|| Supersports Park, Centurion, South Africa||  || 
|-
|  || scope=row style=text-align:center; | 5/62 || rowspan=2| || Pallekele International Cricket Stadium, Kandy, Sri Lanka||  || 
|-
|  || scope=row style=text-align:center; | 3/22 ||  Gaddafi Stadium, Lahore, Pakistan||  || 
|-
|  || scope=row style=text-align:center; | 4/8 ||  || rowspan=2|Sher-e-Bangla Mirpur Stadium, Mirpur, Bangladesh||  || 
|-
|  || scope=row style=text-align:center; | 5/29 ||  ||  || 
|-
|- class=sortbottom
| colspan=6 | <small>Last updated: 20 March 2021.</small>
|}

 Best career average 
A bowler's bowling average is the total number of runs they have conceded divided by the number of wickets they have taken.
Nepal's Sandeep Lamichhane holds the record for the best career average in ODIs with 15.57. Mustafizur Rahman of Bangladesh is the highest-ranked Bangladeshi when the qualification of 2000 balls bowled is followed.

 Best career economy rate 
A bowler's economy rate is the total number of runs they have conceded divided by the number of overs they have bowled.
West Indies' Joel Garner, holds the ODI record for the best career economy rate with 3.09. Bangladesh's Mohammad Rafique, with a rate of 4.39 runs per over conceded over his 123-match ODI career, is the highest Bangladeshi on the list.

 Best career strike rate 
A bowler's strike rate is the total number of balls they have bowled divided by the number of wickets they have taken.
The top bowler with the best ODI career strike rate is South Africa's Lungi Ngidi with strike rate of 23.2 balls per wicket. Bangladesh's Mustafizur Rahman is the highest-ranked Bangladeshi in this list.

 Most four-wickets (& over) hauls in an innings 
Shakib Al Hasan is joint-24th on the list of most four-wicket hauls with Pakistan's Waqar Younis, Sri Lanka's Muttiah Muralitharan and Australia's Brett Lee leading this list in ODIs.

 Most five-wicket hauls in a match 
A five-wicket haul refers to a bowler taking five wickets in a single innings.
Mustafizur Rahman is the highest ranked Bangladeshi on the list of most five-wicket hauls which is headed by Pakistan's Waqar Younis with 13 such hauls.

 Best economy rates in an inning 
The best economy rate in an inning, when a minimum of 30 balls are delivered by the player, is West Indies player Phil Simmons economy of 0.30 during his spell of 3 runs for 4 wickets in 10 overs against Pakistan at Sydney Cricket Ground in the 1991–92 Australian Tri-Series. Shakib Al Hasan holds the Bangladeshi record during his spell in first ODI against Zimbabwe at Mirpur, Dhaka.

 Best strike rates in an inning 
The best strike rate in an inning, when a minimum of 4 wickets are taken by the player, is shared by Sunil Dhaniram of Canada, Paul Collingwood of England and Virender Sehwag of Bangladesh when they achieved a strike rate of 4.2 balls per wicket. Rubel Hossain during his spell of 6/26 achieved the best strike rate for a Bangladeshi bowler.

 Worst figures in an innings 
The worst figures in an ODI came in the 5th One Day International between South Africa at home to Australia in 2006. Australia's Mick Lewis returned figures of 0/113 from his 10 overs in the second innings of the match. The worst figures by a Bangladeshi is 0/87 that came off the bowling of Tapash Baisya in the 2005 Natwest Series game against England at Nottingham.

 Most runs conceded in a match 
Mick Lewis also holds the dubious distinction of most runs conceded in an ODI during the aforementioned match. The top two Bangladeshi records in ODIs are held by Shafiul Islam.

 Most wickets in a calendar year 
Pakistan's Saqlain Mushtaq holds the record for most wickets taken in a year when he took 69 wickets in 1997 in 36 ODIs. Bangladesh's Mashrafe Mortaza is the highest Bangladeshi on the list having taken 49 wickets in 2006.

 Most wickets in a series 
1998–99 Carlton and United Series involving Australia, England and Sri Lanka and the 2019 Cricket World Cup saw the records set for the most wickets taken by a bowler in an ODI series when Australian pacemen Glenn McGrath and Mitchell Starc achieved a total of 27 wickets during the series, respectively. Bangladesh's Mustafizur Rahman is joint 26th with his 20 wickets taken during the 2019 Cricket World Cup.

 Hat-trick 
In cricket, a hat-trick occurs when a bowler takes three wickets with consecutive deliveries. The deliveries may be interrupted by an over bowled by another bowler from the other end of the pitch or the other team's innings, but must be three consecutive deliveries by the individual bowler in the same match. Only wickets attributed to the bowler count towards a hat-trick; run outs do not count.
In ODIs history there have been just 49 hat-tricks, the first achieved by Jalal-ud-Din for Pakistan against Australia in 1982.

Wicket-keeping records
The wicket-keeper is a specialist fielder who stands behind the stumps being guarded by the batsman on strike and is the only member of the fielding side allowed to wear gloves and leg pads.

 Most career dismissals 
A wicket-keeper can be credited with the dismissal of a batsman in two ways, caught or stumped. A fair catch is taken when the ball is caught fully within the field of play without it bouncing after the ball has touched the striker's bat or glove holding the bat, Laws 5.6.2.2 and 5.6.2.3 state that the hand or the glove holding the bat shall be regarded as the ball striking or touching the bat while a stumping occurs when the wicket-keeper puts down the wicket while the batsman is out of his ground and not attempting a run.
Bangladesh's Mushfiqur Rahim is eight in taking most dismissals in ODIs as a designated wicket-keeper with Sri Lanka's Kumar Sangakkara and Australian Adam Gilchrist heading the list.

 Most career catches 
Rahim is 11th in taking most catches in ODIs as a designated wicket-keeper.

 Most career stumpings 
Dhoni holds the record for the most stumpings in ODIs with 123 followed by Sri Lankans Sangakkara and Romesh Kaluwitharana.

 Most dismissals in an innings 
Ten wicket-keepers on 15 occasions have taken six dismissals in a single innings in an ODI. Adam Gilchrist of Australia alone has done it six times.

The feat of taking 5 dismissals in an innings has been achieved by 49 wicket-keepers on 87 occasions including 2 Bangladeshis.

 Most dismissals in a series 
Gilchrist also holds the ODIs record for the most dismissals taken by a wicket-keeper in a series. He made 27 dismissals during the 1998–99 Carlton & United Series. Bangladeshi record is held by Khaled Mashud when he made 11 dismissals during the tour of Zimbabwe in 2006.

Fielding records

 Most career catches 
Caught is one of the nine methods a batsman can be dismissed in cricket. The majority of catches are caught in the slips, located behind the batsman, next to the wicket-keeper, on the off side of the field. Most slip fielders are top order batsmen.

Sri Lanka's Mahela Jayawardene holds the record for the most catches in ODIs by a non-wicket-keeper with 218, followed by Ricky Ponting of Australia on 160 and Bangladeshi Mohammad Azharuddin with 156.Mahmudullah is the leading catcher for Bangladesh.

 Most catches in an innings 
South Africa's Jonty Rhodes is the only fielder to have taken five catches in an innings.

The feat of taking 4 catches in an innings has been achieved by 42 fielders on 44 occasions with Somuya Sarkar being the only Bangladesh fielder.

 Most catches in a series 
The 2019 Cricket World Cup, which was won by England for the first time, saw the record set for the most catches taken by a non-wicket-keeper in an ODI series. Englishman batsman and captain of the England Test team Joe Root took 13 catches in the series as well as scored 556 runs. Soumya Sarkar with 7 catches in the same series is the leading Bangladeshi on this list.

All-round Records
 1000 runs and 100 wickets 
A total of 64 players have achieved the double of 1000 runs and 100 wickets in their ODI career.

 250 runs and 5 wickets in a series 
A total of 50 players on 103 occasions have achieved the double of 250 runs and 5 wickets in a series.

Other records
 Most career matches 
India's Sachin Tendulkar holds the record for the most ODI matches played with 463, with former captains Mahela Jayawardene and Sanath Jayasuriya being second and third having represented Sri Lanka on 443 and 441 occasions, respectively. Mushfiqur Rahim is the most experienced Bangladeshi player having represented the team on 227 occasions.

 Most consecutive career matches 
Tendulkar also holds the record for the most consecutive ODI matches played with 185. He broke Richie Richardson's long standing record of 132 matches.

 Most matches as captain 

Ricky Ponting, who led the Australian cricket team from 2002 to 2012, holds the record for the most matches played as captain in ODIs with 230 (including 1 as captain of ICC World XI team). Mashrafe Mortaza has led Bangladesh in 88 matches.

 Most matches won as a captain 

Most man of the match awards

Most man of the series awards

 Youngest players on Debut 
The youngest player to play in an ODI match is claimed to be Hasan Raza at the age of 14 years and 233 days. Making his debut for Pakistan against Zimbabwe on 30 October 1996, there is some doubt as to the validity of Raza's age at the time. The youngest Bangladeshi to play ODIs was Mohammad Sharif who at the age of 15 years and 116 days debuted in the first ODI of the series against Zimbabwe in April 2001.

 Oldest players on Debut 
The Netherlands batsmen Nolan Clarke is the oldest player to appear in an ODI match. Playing in the 1996 Cricket World Cup against New Zealand in 1996 at Reliance Stadium in Vadodara, Bangladesh he was aged 47 years and 240 days. Jahangir Shah is the oldest Bangladeshi ODI debutant when he played Bangladesh's first ever ODI during the 1986 Asia Cup at the Tyronne Fernando Stadium, Moratuwa, Sri Lanka.

 Oldest players 
The Netherlands batsmen Nolan Clarke is the oldest player to appear in an ODI match. Playing in the 1996 Cricket World Cup against South Africa in 1996 at Rawalpindi Cricket Stadium in Rawalpindi, Pakistan he was aged 47 years and 257 days.

Partnership records
In cricket, two batsmen are always present at the crease batting together in a partnership. This partnership will continue until one of them is dismissed, retires or the innings comes to a close.

Highest partnerships by wicket
A wicket partnership describes the number of runs scored before each wicket falls. The first wicket partnership is between the opening batsmen and continues until the first wicket falls. The second wicket partnership then commences between the not out batsman and the number three batsman. This partnership continues until the second wicket falls. The third wicket partnership then commences between the not out batsman and the new batsman. This continues down to the tenth wicket partnership. When the tenth wicket has fallen, there is no batsman left to partner so the innings is closed.

Highest partnerships by runs
The highest ODI partnership by runs for any wicket is held by the West Indian pairing of Chris Gayle and Marlon Samuels who put together a second wicket partnership of 372 runs during the 2015 Cricket World Cup against Zimbabwe in February 2015. This broke the record of 331 runs set by Indian pair of Sachin Tendulkar and Rahul Dravid against New Zealand in 1999

Highest overall partnership runs by a pair

Umpiring records
Most matches umpired
An umpire in cricket is a person who officiates the match according to the Laws of Cricket''. Two umpires adjudicate the match on the field, whilst a third umpire has access to video replays, and a fourth umpire looks after the match balls and other duties. The records below are only for on-field umpires.

Rudi Koertzen of South Africa holds the record for the most ODI matches umpired with 209. The current active Aleem Dar is currently at 208 matches. They are followed by New Zealand's Billy Bowden who officiated in 200 matches. The most experienced Bangladeshi is ENamul Haque who stood in 54 ODI matches.

See also

List of One Day International cricket records
List of Bangladesh Test cricket records
List of Bangladesh Twenty20 International cricket records

Notes

References

One Day International cricket records
Bangladeshi cricket lists
Lists of Bangladesh cricket records and statistics